Thomas Broughton Charlton (15 August 1815 – 20 January 1886) was an English first-class cricketer active 1839–40 who played for Marylebone Cricket Club (MCC) and Nottinghamshire. He was born and died in Chilwell, Nottinghamshire. He appeared in four first-class matches.

Notes

1815 births
1886 deaths
English cricketers
Marylebone Cricket Club cricketers
Nottinghamshire cricketers
People from Chilwell
Cricketers from Nottinghamshire